Klement Gottwald's Second Cabinet was the cabinet and government of Czechoslovakia in office between 25 February and 15 June 1948. It was formed following the 1948 Czechoslovak coup d'état, and marked the onset of four decades of Communist rule in the country.

Background

In the 1946 Czechoslovak parliamentary election the Communist Party of Czechoslovakia (KSČ) emerged as the largest party, winning 114 of the 300 seats in the Constituent National Assembly with 38% of the vote. Following the elections, the National Front formed a coalition government, headed by KSČ leader Klement Gottwald. Although the government still had a non-Communist majority (nine Communists and seventeen non-Communists), the KSČ had initial control over the police and armed forces through Interior Minister Václav Nosek; in addition to this, the KSČ was gradually able to fill various other positions in the security apparatus with its own candidates.

During the winter of 1947–1948, the tensions between Communists and non-Communists led to increasingly bitter conflict, both in the Cabinet and in parliament. When the non-Communist ministers protested against Nosek's transformations of the security apparatus in February 1948, the Communists responded by mobilizing groups of their supporters across the country. On 13 February, Nosek refused to reverse the recent dismissal of eight senior non-Communist police officers, despite a majority vote in the Cabinet instructing him to do so. In protest, twelve non-Communist ministers resigned from the government on 20 February, hoping that it would lead to the fall of the government and new elections. However, as the ministers of the Czechoslovak Social Democracy and Foreign Minister Jan Masaryk chose not to resign, the government remained. 

Earlier during the government crisis, President Edvard Beneš had stated that he would refuse the replacement of the non-Communist ministers with KSČ members. Despite this, he accepted a new, Communist-dominated government proposed by Gottwald on 25 February, likely out of fear of civil war or Soviet intervention, or hoping to be in a position to later make deals with the KSČ.

Composition 

</noinclude>{| class="wikitable sortable" style="text-align:left"
|+
! rowspan="2" width="37%" |Title
! colspan="3" rowspan="2" |Minister
! colspan="2" |Term of office
! rowspan="2" width="5%" |Party
|-
! width="13%" data-sort-type=date |Start
! width="13%" data-sort-type=date |End
|-
|Prime Minister
| style="background:;" |
|
| width="24%" |Klement Gottwald
| style="text-align:center" |25 February 1948
| style="text-align:center" |15 June 1948
| style="text-align:center" |KSČ
|-
| rowspan=3 |Deputy Prime Minister
| style="background:;" |
|
|Viliam Široký
| style="text-align:center" |25 February 1948
| style="text-align:center" |15 June 1948
| style="text-align:center" |KSČ
|-
| style="background:;" |
|
|Antonín Zápotocký
| style="text-align:center" |25 February 1948
| style="text-align:center" |15 June 1948
| style="text-align:center" |KSČ
|-
| style="background:;" |
|
|Bohumil Laušman
| style="text-align:center" |25 February 1948
| style="text-align:center" |15 June 1948
| style="text-align:center" |ČSD
|-
| rowspan=2 |Minister of Foreign Affairs
| style="background:;" |
|
|Jan Masaryk
| style="text-align:center" |25 February 1948
| style="text-align:center" |10 March 1948
| style="text-align:center" |Independent
|-
| style="background:;" |
|
|Vladimir Clementis
| style="text-align:center" |18 March 1948
| style="text-align:center" |15 June 1948
| style="text-align:center" |KSČ
|-
|Minister of National Defense
| style="background:;" |
|
|Ludvík Svoboda
| style="text-align:center" |25 February 1948
| style="text-align:center" |15 June 1948
| style="text-align:center" |KSČ
|-
|Minister of Foreign Trade
| style="background:;" |
|
|Antonín Gregor
| style="text-align:center" |25 February 1948
| style="text-align:center" |15 June 1948
| style="text-align:center" |KSČ
|-
|Minister of the Interior
| style="background:;" |
|
|Václav Nosek
| style="text-align:center" |25 February 1948
| style="text-align:center" |15 June 1948
| style="text-align:center" |KSČ
|-
|Minister of Finance
| style="background:;" |
|
|Jaromír Dolanský
| style="text-align:center" |25 February 1948
| style="text-align:center" |15 June 1948
| style="text-align:center" |KSČ
|-
|Minister of Education and Culture
| style="background:;" |
|
|Zdeněk Nejedlý
| style="text-align:center" |25 February 1948
| style="text-align:center" |15 June 1948
| style="text-align:center" |KSČ
|-
|Minister of Justice
| style="background:;" |
|
|Alexej Čepička
| style="text-align:center" |25 February 1948
| style="text-align:center" |15 June 1948
| style="text-align:center" |KSČ
|-
|Minister of Information
| style="background:;" |
|
|Václav Kopecký
| style="text-align:center" |25 February 1948
| style="text-align:center" |15 June 1948
| style="text-align:center" |KSČ
|-
|Minister of Industry
| style="background:;" |
|
|Zdeněk Fierlinger
| style="text-align:center" |25 February 1948
| style="text-align:center" |15 June 1948
| style="text-align:center" |ČSD
|-
|Minister of Agriculture
| style="background:;" |
|
|Július Ďuriš
| style="text-align:center" |25 February 1948
| style="text-align:center" |15 June 1948
| style="text-align:center" |KSČ
|-
|Minister of Internal Trade
| style="background:;" |
|
|František Krajčír
| style="text-align:center" |25 February 1948
| style="text-align:center" |15 June 1948
| style="text-align:center" |KSČ
|-
|Minister of Transport
| style="background:;" |
|
|Alois Petr
| style="text-align:center" |25 February 1948
| style="text-align:center" |15 June 1948
| style="text-align:center" |ČSL
|-
|Minister of Labour and Social Welfare
| style="background:;" |
|
|Evžen Erban
| style="text-align:center" |25 February 1948
| style="text-align:center" |15 June 1948
| style="text-align:center" |ČSD
|-
|Minister of Public Health
| style="background:;" |
|
|Josef Plojhar
| style="text-align:center" |25 February 1948
| style="text-align:center" |15 June 1948
| style="text-align:center" |ČSL
|-
|Minister of Technical Planning
| style="background:;" |
|
|Emanuel Šlechta
| style="text-align:center" |25 February 1948
| style="text-align:center" |15 June 1948
| style="text-align:center" |ČSNS
|-
|Minister of Food
| style="background:;" |
|
|Ludmila Jankovcová
| style="text-align:center" |25 February 1948
| style="text-align:center" |15 June 1948
| style="text-align:center" |ČSD
|-
|Minister of Postal Services
| style="background:;" |
|
|Alois Neuman
| style="text-align:center" |25 February 1948
| style="text-align:center" |15 June 1948
| style="text-align:center" |ČSNS
|-
|Minister of Unification
| style="background:;" |
|
|Vavro Šrobár
| style="text-align:center" |25 February 1948
| style="text-align:center" |15 June 1948
| style="text-align:center" |SSI
|-
|Secretary of State for Foreign Affairs
| style="background:;" |
|
|Vladimir Clementis
| style="text-align:center" |25 February 1948
| style="text-align:center" |18 March 1948
| style="text-align:center" |KSČ
|-
|Secretary of State for National Defense
| style="background:;" |
|
|Ján Ševčík
| style="text-align:center" |25 February 1948
| style="text-align:center" |18 March 1948
| style="text-align:center" |DS
|}

References

Government of Czechoslovakia
Communist Party of Czechoslovakia
Cabinets established in 1948
Cabinets disestablished in 1948